King Salmon Airport  is a state-owned public-use airport located just southeast of King Salmon, in the Bristol Bay Borough of the U.S. state of Alaska. It was formerly the Naknek Air Force Base, named for its location near the Naknek River.

As per Federal Aviation Administration records, the airport had 42,310 passenger boardings ( enplanements ) in calendar year 2008, 40,637 enplanements in 2009, and 41,514 in 2010. It is included in the Federal Aviation Administration (FAA) National Plan of Integrated Airport Systems for 2021–2025, in which it is categorized as a non-hub primary commercial service facility.

Facilities and aircraft
King Salmon Airport covers an area of 5,277 acres (2,136 ha) at an elevation of 73 feet (22 m) above mean sea level. It has two asphalt paved runways: 12/30 measuring 8,901 by 150 feet (2,713 × 46 m) and 18/36 measuring 4,017 by 100 feet (1,224 × 30 m).

For the 12-month period ending June 30, 2021 the airport had 25,201 aircraft operations, an average of 69 per day: 65% air taxi, 24% general aviation, 7% scheduled commercial, and 4% military. In August 2022, there were 39 aircraft based at this airport: 33 single-engine, 3 multi-engine, and 3 helicopter.

Airlines and destinations

Passenger

Statistics

Carrier shares

Statistics

Top destinations

Annual traffic

Accidents and incidents
On June 30, 1985, Douglas C-47B N168Z of Northern Peninsula Fisheries was substantially damaged at King Salmon when both engines failed on approach while the aircraft was on an executive flight from Homer Airport, Alaska. The cause of the accident was fuel exhaustion. A fuel filler cap was discovered to be missing after the accident.

References

External links
 Topographic map from USGS The National Map
 
 

Airports in Bristol Bay Borough, Alaska